Sadiq Ali Memon is a Pakistani politician from Thatta. He is a former Member, Provincial Assembly of Sindh (2010-13) and a former Minister (2011-13). He won the National Assembly seat in 2013 general elections from NA-237 (NA-232 now) but was disqualified for being a dual national. 
He is serving as Special Assistant to Chief Minister Sindh for Department of Empowerment of Persons with Disabilities (DEPD) since August 2021.

He is a graduate of the Oklahoma State University.

Political career
He was elected to the National Assembly of Pakistan as a candidate of Pakistan Peoples Party (PPP) from Constituency NA-237 (Thatta-I) in 2013 Pakistani general election.  He was unseated as he was disqualified to continue in office because of his Canadian nationality.

References

Living people
Pakistan People's Party politicians
Sindhi people
People from Thatta District
Pakistani MNAs 2013–2018
Year of birth missing (living people)
Pakistani emigrants to Canada
Naturalized citizens of Canada
Expelled members of the National Assembly of Pakistan
Sindh MPAs 2008–2013
Oklahoma State University alumni